Barzanji (transliteration from Iranian برزنجي) or Berzenci (Turkish spelling) may refer to:

Barzanji Kurds, a Kurdish clan
Mahmud Barzanji (1878–1956)
Jalal Barzanji
Al-Barzanjī
Kamal Barzanji, Iraqi Air Force commander

See also
Barzan (disambiguation)
Barzani (disambiguation)